This is a list of the 100 most populous counties in the United States based on the national decennial US census conducted on April 1, 2020 and vintage Census population estimates for July 1, 2021.

Many of the counties on the list include major cities or metropolitan areas in all parts of the United States. Six of the listed counties have consolidated city and county government, namely the City and County of Honolulu, Metropolitan Government of Nashville and Davidson County, Tennessee, City and County of Philadelphia, City and County of San Francisco, City of Jacksonville and Duval County and City and County of Denver. New York County, Bronx County, Kings County, Queens County and Richmond County are coterminous with the respective boroughs of New York City; they fall under the jurisdiction of the combined city government. Independent cities are not counted.

Many of the most populous counties listed are in Southern California, Illinois, Texas and New York and roughly correspond to the most populous cities in the United States. Counties in the Western United States are typically larger, so they often have higher raw populations even with comparable population densities.

List
This list lists the most populous US counties sorted according to both the 2020 official enumeration and 2021 vintage population estimates by the United States Census Bureau (USCB).

Gallery

References

Populous
Counties Most Populous
Counties